Family Happiness is a 1969 Soviet comedy film-almanac directed by Andrey Ladynin, Aleksandr Sheyn Sr. and Sergey Solovev.

Plot 
The film consists of four short stories. The first short story tells about a bored mistress who falls in love with the tutor of her children. The second short story tells of a married man, frightened by stories of various mystical phenomena, who spends the night with a governess. In the third story, a man catches his wife with her lover and he decides to kill her for it. And suddenly he begins to guess about the possible punishment for this crime. The fourth short story shows the matchmaking of the landowner Lomov to the daughter of his neighbor.

Cast 
 Alisa Freindlikh as Anna Kapitonova
 Vyacheslav Tikhonov as Kapitonov
 Nikolay Burlyaev as grammar-school boy Schupaltsev
 Andrey Mironov as Fyodor Sigaev
 Valentin Gaft as Salesman
 Tatyana Vasileva as Chubakov's daughter
 Alla Budnitskaya as Sigaev's wife
 Georgy Burkov as landowner Lomov
 Nikolai Gritsenko as Vaksin
 Raisa Kurkina as Vaksin's wife

References

External links 
 

1969 films
1960s Russian-language films
Soviet comedy films
1969 comedy films